Roussy–Lévy syndrome, also known as Roussy–Lévy areflexic dystasia, is a rare disorder of humans that results in progressive muscle wasting. It is caused by mutation the s that code for proteins necessary for the functioning of the myelin sheath of the, affecting the conductance of nerve signals and resulting in loss of muscles' ability to move.

The condition affects people from infants through adults.

Signs and symptoms 

Symptoms of the Roussy–Lévy syndrome mainly stem from damage and the resulting progressive muscle atrophy. Neurological damage may result in absent tendon reflexes (areflexia), some distal sensory loss and decreased excitability of muscles to galvanic and faradic stimulation. Progressive muscle wasting results in weakness of distal limb muscles (especially the peronei), gait ataxia, pes cavus, postural tremors and static tremor of the upper limbs and foot deformity.

These symptoms frequently translate into delayed onset of ability to walk, loss of coordination and balance, foot drop, and foot-bone deformities. They are usually first observed during infancy or early childhood, and slowly progress until about age 30, at point progression may stop in individuals.

Causes 

The Roussy–Lévy syndrome has been associated with two mutations: a duplication of the PMP22 gene that carries the instructions for producing the peripheral myelin protein 22, a critical component of the myelin sheath; and a missense mutation in the MPZ gene which codes for myelin protein zero, a major structural protein of peripheral myelin.

As PMP22 mutations are also associated with Charcot–Marie–Tooth disease type 1A and MPZ mutations are associated with Charcot–Marie–Tooth disease type 1B, it remains the subject of discussion whether the Roussy–Lévy syndrome is a separate entity or a specific phenotype of either disorder. It can also be caused by childhood trauma.

Pathophysiology 

In common with other types of Charcot–Marie–Tooth disease, examination reveals decreased nerve conduction velocity and histologic features of a hypertrophic demyelinating neuropathy. Electromyography shows signs of mild neurogenic damage while biopsy shows onion bulb formations; the appearance of these formations is what primarily led Gustave Roussy and Gabrielle Lévy, the scientists who first described the disorder, to classify it as a variant of Charcot–Marie–Tooth disease.

To create a working nerve, neurons, Schwann cells, and fibroblasts must work together. Molecular signals are exchanged between Schwann cells and neurons to regulate survival and differentiation of a nerve. However, these signals are disrupted in patients with the Roussy–Lévy syndrome.

Diagnosis 

While the clinical picture may point towards the diagnosis of the Roussy–Lévy syndrome, the condition can only be confirmed with absolute certainty by carrying out KT or MRT.

Treatment 

 For Roussy–Lévy syndrome no pharmacological treatment required.

Treatment options focus on corrective therapy. Patients tend to benefit greatly from physical therapy (especially water therapy as it does not place excessive pressure on the muscles), while moderate activity is often recommended to maintain movement, flexibility, muscle strength and endurance.

Patients with foot deformities may benefit from corrective surgery, which, however, is usually a last resort. Most such surgeries include straightening and pinning the toes, lowering the arch, and sometimes, fusing the ankle joint to provide stability. Recovering from these surgeries is oftentimes long and difficult. Proper foot care including custom-made shoes and leg braces may minimize discomfort and increase function.

While no medicines are reported to treat the disorder, patients are advised to avoid certain medications as they may aggravate the symptoms.

Prognosis 

The Roussy–Lévy syndrome is not a fatal disease and life expectancy is normal.

History

See also 
 Charcot–Marie–Tooth disease
 Dejerine–Sottas disease

References

External links 

Autosomal dominant disorders
Neurogenetic disorders
Syndromes